Current Opinion in Anesthesiology is a bimonthly peer-reviewed medical journal covering anaesthesiology. It is published by Lippincott Williams & Wilkins and its editors-in-chief are Paul G. Barash (Yale School of Medicine) and Hugo Van Aken (University of Münster). According to the Journal Citation Reports, the journal has a 2013 impact factor of 2.526.

See also
 Current Opinion (Lippincott Williams & Wilkins)

References

External links 
 

Anesthesiology and palliative medicine journals
English-language journals
Bimonthly journals
Lippincott Williams & Wilkins academic journals
Publications established in 1988